Trump Card is a 2010 Bollywood film directed by Arshad Khan. The film stars Vishwajeet Pradhan, Vikram Kumar, Haidar Ali, Urvashi Chaudhary. This is a thriller story of deceit, love crime. This film was released on 12 March 2010.

Cast
 Vishwajeet Pradhan
 Vikram Kumar
 Haider Ali
 Urvashi Chaudhary

Soundtrack
The music was composed by Lalit Sen.

External links

2000s Hindi-language films
Indian crime thriller films
2009 crime thriller films
2009 films